Operación Triunfo is a Spanish reality television music competition to find new singing talent. The first series, also known as Operación Triunfo 2001, aired on La 1 from  22 October 2001 to 11 February 2002, presented by Carlos Lozano. 

Rosa López was the winner of the series.

Headmaster, judges and presenter
Headmaster: Nina
Judges: Pilar Tabares, Alejandro Abad and Narcís Rebollo
Presenter: Carlos Lozano

Contestants

Galas

Results summary
Colour key

References

Operación Triunfo
La 1 (Spanish TV channel) original programming